Dolichodial is a natural chemical compound with two aldehyde groups, which belongs to the group of iridoids.

Chemistry
It has in its five-membered ring three asymmetric carbon atoms and accordingly exists in four diastereomeric pairs of enantiomers. The pairs with a different stereochemistry of dolichodial are called anisomorphal and peruphasmal.

Occurrence
Dolichodial and its stereoisomers can be found in the essential oils of certain plants, and also in the defensive secretions of some insect species.

References

Conjugated aldehydes
Iridoids
Cyclopentanes
Vinylidene compounds